The 1882 Wimbledon Championships took place on the outdoor grass courts at the All England Lawn Tennis Club in Wimbledon, London, United Kingdom. The tournament ran from 8 July until 17 July. It was the 6th staging of the Wimbledon Championships, and the first Grand Slam tennis event of 1882.

Ernest Renshaw won the all comers' final against R. T. Richardson, 7–5, 6–3, 2–6, 6–3 and later lost against his twin brother and defending champion William Renshaw in the final, 6–1, 2–6, 4–6, 6–2, 6–2.  The London Standard in a match report stated "...the brothers Renshaw gave perhaps the finest exposition of the game of lawn tennis ever seen at Wimbledon."  The challenge round was watched by 2000 spectators.

Gentlemen's singles

Final

 William Renshaw defeated  Ernest Renshaw, 6–1, 2–6, 4–6, 6–2, 6–2

All Comers' Final
 Ernest Renshaw defeated  Richard Richardson, 7–5, 6–3, 2–6, 6–3

References

External links
 Official Wimbledon Championships website

 
Wimbledon Championship
Wimbledon Championship
Wimbledon Championship
July 1882 sports events